A hreppur is a rural municipality in Iceland.

It is one of the oldest Icelandic administrative units, probably dating back to before 1000 AD, when a hreppur had at least twenty freeholders, although smaller units could be established if the Lögrétta gave permission. The term (Old norse hreppr) is mentioned in the Gray Goose Laws (Grágás) and the Law of Iceland (Jónsbók).

The "hreppr" was independent of the chieftain-Þing structure. It collected and distributed the tithes and mandatory contributions designated for the poor, which were assigned to various households for different lengths of time according to the wealth of the household. The "hreppr" also took charge of an insurance system. A member who lost more than 1/4 of his herds due to disease was entitled to recover half of the loss.

The use of the term "hreppur" is in decline as urban communities merge into new municipalities.

References

Subdivisions of Iceland
Types of administrative division